Purpuraturris is a taxonomic family name for a number of predatory sea snails, marine gastropod mollusks in the family Turridae.

Species

References

External links
 Chase, K., Watkins, M., Safavi-Hemami, H. & Olivera, B. M. (2022). Integrating venom peptide libraries into a phylogenetic and broader biological framework. Frontiers in Molecular Biosciences. 9: 784419

Turridae
Gastropods described in 2022